Lusi may refer to:

Geography
 Lüsi, Port Lüsi, or Lüsigang, a town in southeastern Jiangsu, China
 Lusi, Greece, an ancient city of the Achaean League
 Lusi (Heinola), a village in Heinola, Finland
 The Sidoarjo mud flow, a mud volcano in Java, Indonesia, nicknamed Lusi by the local population
 Lusi River, a tributary of the Solo River in northern Java, Indonesia
 Luci Island, also known as Lusi Island, in Xiuyu District, Putian, Fujian, China

People 
 Lusi Sione, a former New Zealand rugby league player
 Jing Lusi (born 1985), a British actress of Chinese descent
 Spiridion Lusi, Greek scholar, diplomat, politician and naturalized ambassador of Prussia.

Other uses
 The Lusi language of New Britain
 Tropical Cyclone Lusi, a storm in the 1997–98 South Pacific cyclone season
 Cyclone Lusi, a storm in the 2013–14 South Pacific cyclone season

See also 
 Lushi (disambiguation)
 Lusis, the debut album of Christian industrial dance band Mortal
 Sione Lousi, a professional rugby league footballer